Nizhnedevitsk is the name of several rural localities in Nizhnedevitsky District of Voronezh Oblast, Russia:
Nizhnedevitsk, Nizhnedevitskoye Rural Settlement, Nizhnedevitsky District, Voronezh Oblast, a selo in Nizhnedevitskoye Rural Settlement
Nizhnedevitsk, Novoolshanskoye Rural Settlement, Nizhnedevitsky District, Voronezh Oblast, a settlement in Novoolshanskoye Rural Settlement